RIBA Knowledge Communities are web supported interdisciplinary groups for facilitating capturing, sharing, and applying of professional knowledge relating to architecture and the built environment. The Knowledge Communities initiative provides a knowledge community platform developed by the RIBA. It is a non-commercial collaborative resource, open to all built environment professionals and anyone with interrelated knowledge to share. Its purpose is to connect and engage these professionals in the advancement of their specific subjects of interest.

Communities 

There are currently RIBA Knowledge Communities for the following subject areas:

Sustainability For building environment professionals to discuss the sustainable production of architecture and to engage with the RIBA Sustainable Futures Group.
Integrated Project Working To engage an interdisciplinary professional base in the advancement of CAD, BIM and the mutual distribution of technical information between all areas of the building environment.
Education Building Design Helping to deliver intelligent higher education and further education school design and providing a forum for this discussion. It will leverage the level engagement among professionals in the industry. It will lead to enhanced outputs.
Students of Architecture For architecture students to share news, experience and events while keeping in touch with architectural research and progression.
Regulations and Standards To involve members in the production of building regulations and standards and to support the ongoing work of the joint BRE CIAT RIBA Technical Task Force.
Traditional Architecture The RIBA Traditional Architecture group’s space to disseminate their research and to capture the experience of their members.
International For the RIBA’s International department to build a knowledge bank from around the world.
Small Practice Providing a platform for architects in small practice to share their experience while having the opportunity to be a part of the consultations for the RIBA Small Practice Group papers.
Development and Disaster Relief To explore the difference that innovative design and construction can make in the lives of some of the most vulnerable people on earth (facilitated by Article 25).
Urban Greening To create the pre-conditions necessary for trees to be considered as an integral part of development at the earliest conceptual and design stages of any scheme (facilitated by the Trees and Design Action Group).

Structure 

The RIBA Knowledge Communities website is supported by the RIBA Research & Development department as an architectural knowledge management initiative. The communities are structured around the pre-existing RIBA committees. These groups are tasked with creating and initiating an agenda for the development of their respective subjects related to the built environment.

Champion An appointed RIBA Knowledge Champion acts as a focal point for the governance of their respective RIBA Knowledge Community. They are selected on the basis of their expertise and active involvement in the community’s field of knowledge.
Expert Peer Group/Committee The Peer Group consists of approximately 5-8 individuals. They are selected for their expertise and active involvement in their community's field of knowledge. The group delegates responsibilities in liaison with the community Facilitators and community members for routine tasks and responsibilities as well as one-off activities.
Community Facilitators Facilitators will support the creation and maintenance of the communities.  They are the main administrative focus for the work of the community. They receive support from the RIBA Research & Development department and provide assistance to ‘Knowledge Champions’ and ‘Expert Peer Groups’.
Community Members Knowledge Communities are organised as collections of architects and other professionals who are committed to collaborations within specialist areas of design, management and construction.

Applications 

The RIBA Knowledge Communities website provides applications designed to engage the members in their subjects of interest, these include:

Personal blogs
Community discussion forums
Community events calendars
Contacts
Members directory
Resources (uploading files to share with other community members)
Tags
RSS feeds

The RIBA Knowledge Communities is powered by Elgg (software) which is an open source networking platform. The applications are installed as plugins that can be downloaded from the Elgg community website or created by PHP developers.

References

External links 
 RIBA Knowledge Communities
 RIBA Sustainable Futures Group
 BRE
 CIAT
 Architecture.com
 RIBA's International department
 RIBA Small Practice Group
 Article 25
 Trees and Design Action Group
 RIBA Research & Development department

Architectural communication
Knowledge management
Royal Institute of British Architects

sk:Royal Institute of British Architects